American Friends is a 1991 British film starring Michael Palin. It was written by Palin and its director, Tristram Powell.

Plot
Palin plays Francis Ashby, a senior Oxford professor on holiday in the Swiss Alps in 1861. There he meets the American Caroline Hartley (Connie Booth) and her 18-year-old ward Elinor (Trini Alvarado). Ashby is drawn to them both, particularly Elinor, but is rather surprised when they arrive in Oxford and rent a house. Women are not allowed in the college, nor are fellows allowed to marry, which puts him in an embarrassing situation. Ashby's rival for the post of college president, Oliver Syme (Alfred Molina), takes full advantage of this to try to discredit Ashby.

Inspiration
The plot was based on a real-life incident involving Palin's great-grandfather, Edward Palin.

Cast

 Michael Palin - Rev. Francis Ashby
 Trini Alvarado - Elinor Hartley
 Connie Booth - Caroline Hartley
 Alfred Molina - Oliver Syme
 Bryan Pringle - Haskell
 Fred Pearson - Hapgood
 Susan Denaker - Mrs. Cantrell
 Jonathan Firth - Cable
 Ian Dunn - Gowers
 Robert Eddison - William Granger Rushden
 David Calder - Pollitt
 Simon Jones - Anderson
 Charles McKeown - Maynard
 Roger Lloyd-Pack  -  Dr. Butler
 John Nettleton - Rev. Groves
 Alun Armstrong - Dr. Victor Weeks
 Sheila Reid - Mrs. Weeks
 Edward Rawle-Hicks - John Weeks
 Markus Gehrig - Swiss Guide
 Jo Stone-Fewings - Undergraduate
 Jimmy Jewel - Ashby Senior
 Wensley Pithey - Cave
 Arthur Howard - Voe
 Charles Simon - Canon Harper
 Adrian Gannon - Extra

Awards
The film won the Writers' Guild of Great Britain Award for Best film/screenplay.

Discography

The CD soundtrack composed by Georges Delerue is available on Music Box Records label.

Reference list

External links 

1991 films
1991 comedy films
British comedy films
Films scored by Georges Delerue
British films based on actual events
Films set in Oxford
Films set in 1861
Films with screenplays by Michael Palin
1990s English-language films
1990s British films